The Fifth Ward Railroad was a horse-drawn street trolley line in Syracuse, New York, and was originally approved for construction by New York State in 1850; however, the rail was not chartered until 1867 and finally opened for business in 1868. The company merged with Syracuse Consolidated Street Railway in 1890, after an agreement was made that allowed the new company to lease the lines. 

By 1875, the road extended from Washington Street to South Street and Geddes Street.

References

Defunct railroads in Syracuse, New York
Defunct New York (state) railroads
Railway companies established in 1867
Railway companies disestablished in 1890
Interurban railways in New York (state)
American companies disestablished in 1890
American companies established in 1867